Secret Maryo Chronicles is a free and open-source two-dimensional platform computer game that began in 2003. The game has been described by the German PCtipp as a Super Mario Bros. clone.

History 

Secret Maryo Chronicles began as a SourceForge project in January 2003. It was developed and is maintained by the Secret Maryo Chronicles development team, led by Florian Richter ("FluXy"). The game is OpenGL-based and has an original soundtrack and a built-in game editor. It has been released under the GNU General Public License, Version 3. The game has been expanded up the latest release in 2009.

The Secret Chronicles of Dr. M.
A continuation called The Secret Chronicles of Dr. M. (TSC) is as of April 2017 under continued development.

Reception 
Secret Maryo Chronicles was listed as the number one open source video game by APC in January 2008. The game was named one of the most promising open source games of 2008 by El Heraldo. In 2008, Stern praised the speed of the game and its puzzle solving, and heute praised it as a well-made nonviolent game for children. Secret Maryo Chronicles was selected in March 2009 as "HotPick" by Linux Format. An in-detail review of the Free Software Magazine in 2015 called the game a "great way to procrastinate".

The game became a popular freeware title offered by many freeware download outlets; the game was downloaded over 3.4 million times just via SourceForge.net between 2004 and May 2017.

See also

 List of open-source video games
SuperTux
Mari0

References

External links 

 
 The Secret Chronicles of Dr. M., the official sequel

2003 video games
Open-source video games
Platform games
Linux games
MacOS games
Windows games
Unofficial works based on Mario
Free software that uses SDL
Video game clones
Fangames
Freeware games